Jerry van Wolfgang (previously known as Jerry van Ewijk) (born 12 March 1992) is a Dutch footballer who plays as a winger for Goyang KH.

Club career
Jerry van Ewijk made his professional debut for AGOVV Apeldoorn and joined De Graafschap on non-professional terms in 2012. He scored 18 goals for the Superboeren in the 2014–15 season and moved to relegated Go Ahead Eagles at the end of that season. With both De Graafschap and Go Ahead he won promotion to the Eredivisie.

Van Ewijk moved abroad to play for United Soccer League side Orange County in January 2017.

After playing the 2018 season with Reno 1868 FC, van Ewijk rejoined Orange County on 11 February 2019.

Before the 2020 season, he joined K3 League side Cheonan City FC.

International career
Van Ewijk played 10 matches for the Netherlands U-17 team including 3 at the 2009 UEFA European Under-17 Championship.
He also played 3 games for the Netherlands U-19s.

References

External links
 Voetbal International profile 

1992 births
Living people
Footballers from Arnhem
Association football wingers
Dutch footballers
Netherlands youth international footballers
Dutch expatriate footballers
PSV Eindhoven players
AGOVV Apeldoorn players
De Graafschap players
Go Ahead Eagles players
Orange County SC players
Reno 1868 FC players
Cheonan City FC players
Eerste Divisie players
USL Championship players
K3 League players
Expatriate soccer players in the United States
Expatriate footballers in South Korea
Dutch expatriate sportspeople in the United States
Dutch expatriate sportspeople in South Korea